The Marañón white-fronted capuchin (Cebus yuracus) also or known as Peruvian white-fronted capuchin or Andean white-fronted capuchin  is a species of gracile capuchin monkey from the upper Amazon Basin.  It had been regarded as synonymous with the shock-headed capuchin (C. cuscinus), which was then considered a subspecies of Humboldt's white-fronted capuchin, but it was classified as a separate species by Mittermeier and Rylands based on genetic studies by Boubli.

The Marañón white-fronted capuchin lives in wet forests of the upper Amazon basin in southern Colombia, eastern Ecuador, northeastern Peru and likely eastern Brazil.

Marañón white-fronted capuchins sometimes formed mixed groups with the Ecuadorian squirrel monkey.

References

Capuchin monkeys
Mammals of Colombia
Mammals of Ecuador
Mammals of Peru
Mammals of Brazil
Mammals described in 1949
Taxa named by Philip Hershkovitz
Primates of South America